Lanark—Frontenac—Kingston is a federal electoral district in Eastern Ontario, Canada.

History
Lanark—Frontenac—Kingston was created by the 2012 federal electoral boundaries redistribution and was legally defined in the 2013 representation order. It came into effect upon the call of the 42nd Canadian federal election, scheduled for 19 October 2015. The riding was created out of parts of Lanark—Frontenac—Lennox and Addington (79%), Carleton—Mississippi Mills (13%) and Kingston and the Islands (8%).

The riding was originally intended to be named Lanark—Frontenac.

Geography
The riding consists of the entirety of Lanark County (including Perth and Smiths Falls) and all of Frontenac County (including Kingston) north of Highway 401.

Members of Parliament

This riding has elected the following Members of Parliament:

Election results

References

Ontario federal electoral districts
Carleton Place
Kingston, Ontario